Piyamas Koijapo (born October 23, 1978 in Nakhon Ratchasima) is a Thai indoor volleyball player. She is a member of the Thailand women's national volleyball team.

Clubs
  Pepsi (2007)
  Chang (2012)
  Kathu Phuket (2011–2012)
  Sisaket (2012–2013)

References

External links
 FIVB Biography

1978 births
Living people
Piyamas Koijapo
Volleyball players at the 2002 Asian Games
Volleyball players at the 2006 Asian Games
Piyamas Koijapo
Piyamas Koijapo
Southeast Asian Games medalists in volleyball
Competitors at the 2001 Southeast Asian Games
Competitors at the 2003 Southeast Asian Games
Competitors at the 2005 Southeast Asian Games
Competitors at the 2007 Southeast Asian Games
Piyamas Koijapo